The following is a list of the 97 municipalities (comuni) of the Province of Lecce, Apulia, Italy.

List

See also
List of municipalities of Italy

References

Lecce